Karadere is a village in Anamur district of Mersin Province, Turkey. At  it is merged to Anamur to the southeast, still keeping the legal entity. As of 2011, the population of Karadere was 566.

References

Villages in Anamur District